William Remington Moses (born November 17, 1959) is an American actor.

Early life
Moses was born in Los Angeles, the son of actress Marian McCargo (1932–2004) and advertising executive Richard Cantrell Moses Sr., who married in 1951 and divorced in 1963.

Marian remarried in 1970 to the Republican Congressman Alphonzo E. Bell Jr. (1914–2004). Congressman Bell adopted Moses and his brothers Rick and Harry. He briefly attended Wesleyan University.

Career
Moses is probably best known for playing Cole Gioberti in the 1980s prime-time soap opera Falcon Crest, for six seasons from 1981–86 (although he returned for two guest appearances during the show's seventh season in 1987).

In 1988, Moses co-starred in the film Mystic Pizza with Julia Roberts. He then joined Raymond Burr in 17 Perry Mason TV movies from 1989–93, playing Ken Malansky, an attorney who worked with title character Mason as a private investigator (although in Moses' first appearance as Malansky, the character – then a law student – was defended by Mason on a murder charge). Moses continued the role in the four TV films produced after Burr's death in 1993, subtitled A Perry Mason Mystery (which aired until 1995 and starring Paul Sorvino and Hal Holbrook).

In 1992, Moses returned to soap operas, playing the recurring role of Keith Gray in 11 episodes of Melrose Place. In 1997, he played David Graysmark in the short-lived series Fame L.A.. He continued to appear in a number of films and TV movies including Double Exposure, Trial by Jury (both 1994), Hangman's Curse (2003), Christmas Child (2004), A Lover's Revenge (2005) (starring his former Perry Mason co-star Alexandra Paul), and as Jack Davis in nine of the Jane Doe series of TV films from 2005–2008. In November 2022, he was cast in the role of Jeff Webber on the ABC soap opera General Hospital. 

Moses has also made guest appearances in a variety of television series throughout his career including Fantasy Island, The Love Boat, Murder, She Wrote, CSI:Miami and ''Homeland' and Major Crimes, among others.

Personal life
Moses was married to actress Tracy Nelson from 1987 to 1997, with whom he has a daughter, actress Remington Elizabeth Moses (born 1992). In 2000 he married Sarah Moses.

Filmography

Feature films

Television films

Television series

References

External links
 

1959 births
Living people
American male film actors
American male soap opera actors
Male actors from Los Angeles
Wesleyan University alumni
20th-century American male actors
21st-century American male actors